The Louise Suggs Invitational was a golf tournament on the LPGA Tour from 1966 to 1968. It was played at three different locations in Palm Beach County, Florida. In 1966, it was named the Louise Suggs Delray Beach Invitational. Louise Suggs, LPGA Tour founder and Delray Beach, Florida resident, was the tournament host.

Winners

References

Former LPGA Tour events
Golf in Florida
Boynton Beach, Florida
Women's sports in Florida